Pastende Manor is a manor house in the historical region of Courland, in western Latvia. Originally built in 1700, it was remodeled between 1780 and 1800. Since 1945 the building has housed the Pastende primary school.

See also
List of palaces and manor houses in Latvia

References

External links

  Pastende Manor

Manor houses in Latvia
Talsi Municipality